Mauritia histrio, common name the harlequin cowry or the stage cowry, is a species of sea snail, a cowry, a marine gastropod mollusk in the family Cypraeidae, the cowries.

Description
The basic color of the shell is pale brown, with many grey round spots on the dorsum surface and several dark brown marginal spots on the edges. The base is mainly white or pale brown, with a wide aperture and well-developed darker teeth, longer and stronger on the outer side. In the living mollusk the mantle is transparent, with short papillae. Mauritia histrio is quite similar to Cypraea arabica and Mauritia eglantina.

Distribution

This species is distributed in the Indian Ocean and Western Pacific Ocean, along Aldabra, Chagos, East Africa, Kenya, Madagascar, the Mascarene Basin, Mauritius, Mozambique,  Réunion, the Seychelles, Tanzania, North West Australia and Philippines.

Habitat
Mauritia histrio lives in tropical shallow water. It is nocturnal, hiding during the day under rocks, large blocks or in deep crevices in coral reefs.

Synonyms
Cypraea histrio Gmelin, 1791 (basionym)
Cypraea reticulata Martyn, 1784
Cypraea amethystea Linnaeus, 1758
Cypraea histrio Gmelin, 1791
Cypraea oculata  Röding, 1798
Cypraea undosa Röding, 1798
Cypraea arlequina Mörch, 1852
Arabica westralis Iredale, 1935
Mauritia (Arabica) histrio var. duploreticulata Coen, 1949

Subspecies
 Mauritia histrio histrio Gmelin, 1791
 Mauritia histrio westralis Iredale, 1935

References

 Verdcourt, B. (1954). The cowries of the East African Coast (Kenya, Tanganyika, Zanzibar and Pemba). Journal of the East Africa Natural History Society 22(4) 96: 129-144, 17 pls.
 Felix Lorenz and Alex Hubert : A Guide to Worldwide Cowries, second revised edition - Conch Books, 2002
 Burgess, C.M. (1970) - The Living Cowries - AS Barnes and Co, Ltd. Cranbury, New Jersey

External links
 Biolib
 
 Cowries
 Mauritia species
 Cowries
 Clade

Cypraeidae
Gastropods described in 1791
Taxa named by Johann Friedrich Gmelin